A bronze sculpture of Todd Kirnan by Heather Soderberg was installed in Gresham, Oregon, in September 2018. The life-size statue at Northeast Third and Main Street honors Kirnan, an autistic delivery man nicknamed "Mister Gresham". It depicts Kirnan wearing a Portland Trail Blazers jersey with the number 22 for Clyde Drexler. The artwork cost approximately $54,000 and was funded by private donations from community members. The statue's dedicated was accompanied with a parade attended by hundreds.

See also

 List of public art in Gresham, Oregon

References

External links
 Todd Kirnan, Coffee Man at Roadside America

2018 establishments in Oregon
2018 sculptures
Bronze sculptures in Oregon
Gresham, Oregon
Monuments and memorials in Oregon
Outdoor sculptures in Oregon
Sculptures of men in Oregon
Statues in Oregon